is a railway station in Katsuragi, Nara Prefecture, Japan.

Line
Kintetsu Minami Osaka Line

Layout
The station has two side platforms and two tracks.

Express trains stop at this station and adjacent Taimadera Station during the peony season in spring.

Adjacent stations

Railway stations in Japan opened in 1929
Railway stations in Nara Prefecture